Eyeball is a 1975 Italian giallo slasher film written and directed by Umberto Lenzi.

Plot

A maniac killer in red rain coat is killing off American tourists on a tour bus by gouging out their eyeballs.

Cast

Release

Home media
The film was released on DVD by Sinister Film on January 1, 2014.
It was announced that 88 Films would release a Mega edition of the film on Blu-ray on August 27, 2018.

Reception

In his analysis of the film, author Louis Paul described the film as "entertaining" and "enjoyable".
The Terror Trap gave the film 3/4 stars, calling it "[a] Completely enjoyable giallo from Umberto Lenzi". The reviewer also commended the film's score, "bizarro plot", cast, and death sequences. Justin Kerswell from Hysteria Lives! awarded the film 3/5 stars, stating that the film was director Lenzi's least accomplished giallo, but a'so stated that it was "a thoroughly entertaining 90 minutes of slasher trash". Dan Budnik from The Bleeding Skull! called the film "a mighty entertaining giallo", and commended the film's atmosphere, pacing, and odd characters.

TV Guide hated the film, calling it "worthless", and criticized the film's gimmicky villain.

References
Bibliography

Notes

External links
 
 
 
 

1970s crime thriller films
1970s serial killer films
Films directed by Umberto Lenzi
Films scored by Bruno Nicolai
Films shot in Barcelona
Giallo films
1970s Italian-language films
Italian crime thriller films
Italian horror thriller films
Italian mystery thriller films
1970s mystery thriller films
Italian serial killer films
1970s horror thriller films
1970s slasher films
Italian slasher films
1970s exploitation films
1970s Italian films